Eurypteroidea are an extinct superfamily of eurypterids. It contains three families (Dolichopteridae, Eurypteridae, Strobilopteridae) and two genera of uncertain classification, Paraeurypterus and Pentlandopterus.

Description
Eurypteroidea, which lived from the Ordovician to Devonian periods, were characterized by their last pair of prosomal (head) appendages, which were developed as swimming legs, carrying paddles formed by the expansion of the two penultimate joints.

Families
Order Eurypterida Burmeister, 1843
Suborder Eurypterina  Burmeister, 1845
Superfamily Eurypteroidea Burmeister, 1845
Genus Paraeurypterus Lamsdell, Hoşgör & Selden, 2013
Genus Pentlandopterus Lamsdell, Hoşgör & Selden, 2013
Family Dolichopteridae Kjellesvig-Waering & Størmer, 1952
Family Eurypteridae Burmeister, 1845
Family Strobilopteridae Lamsdell & Selden, 2013

References

 
Ordovician arthropods
Silurian animals
Devonian animals
Late Devonian animals
Carboniferous arthropods
Permian animals
Silurian first appearances
Permian extinctions
Chelicerate superfamilies